Blossom Entertainment is a talent management agency based in Seoul, South Korea. Founded in 2012, its roster includes actors Cha Tae-hyun, Yang Se-jong, and Lim Ju-hwan.

Foundation
Blossom Entertainment was co-founded by actor Cha Tae-hyun and his manager Ju Bang-ok in March 2012 after their respective contracts expired from Sidus HQ.

Artists

Current

 Cha Tae-hyun
 Chae Sang-woo
 Hyun Jun
 Jung Eui-jae
 Jung Gun-joo
 Jung Moon-sung
 Kim Min-chul
 Kim Su-an
 Kwak Sun-young
 Lee Yoo-jin
 Lim Ju-hwan
 Son Chang-min
 Song Jong-ho
 Kim Gun-woo  
 Yang Se-jong
 Han Soo-ah

Former

 Song Joong-ki
Shin Seung-hwan
Lee Gwang-hun
Han Sang-jin
 Kim Bo-ryoung
Ko Chang-seok
Lee Seo-won
Son Seung-won
Kwon So-hyun
Jung So-min
 Park Bo-gum

Filmography

Serials
All produced by subsidiary Blossom Story unless otherwise noted

Films
All produced by subsidiary Blossom Pictures unless otherwise noted

Recognition

References

External links

Talent agencies of South Korea
Entertainment companies established in 2012